Pedda may refer to:

Pedda Adiserla Pally (Telugu: పెద్ద అడిసేర్ల పల్లి), a Mandal in Nalgonda district of Andhra Pradesh, India
Pedda Elikicherla (Telugu: పెద్ద ఎల్కిచర్ల), a village and Gram panchayat in Kondurg mandal of Mahbubnagar district, Andhra Pradesh, India
Pedda Gopathi, village in India's Andhra Pradesh state in the Khammam district
Pedda kadabur, village and a Mandal in Kurnool district in the state of Andhra Pradesh in India
Pedda Komera, the major village under Odela mandal with one small village (Chinna Komera) and two hamlets  (Sandipally, Ilavenipally)
Pedda Kothapalle (Telugu: పెద్దకొత్తపల్లి), a Mandal in Mahbubnagar district, Andhra Pradesh
Pedda Orampadu, village in Obulavaripalle mandal, Kadapa District, Andhra Pradesh, India

See also
Pedda Bala Siksha, small encyclopedia in the Telugu language, suitable for children and adults